Denticetopsis sauli is a species of whale catfish endemic to Venezuela, where it is only known from the Pamoni River in the Casiquiare River basin of the upper Rio Negro system.  This species grows to a length of 2.1 cm (0.8 inches).

References

External links 

 Vari, R.P. and C.J. Ferraris Jr., 2003. Cetopsidae (Whale catfishes). p. 257-260. In R.E. Reis, S.O. Kullander and C.J. Ferraris, Jr. (eds.) Checklist of the Freshwater Fishes of South and Central America. Porto Alegre: EDIPUCRS, Brasil. (Ref. 36486)

Cetopsidae
Catfish of South America
Endemic fauna of Venezuela
Fish of Venezuela
Fish described in 1996